The Pragersko–Središče Railway is a  long railway in Slovenia that connects the Slovenian town Pragersko with the Croatian railway network west of Čakovec. The  Pragersko-Ormož section of the railway, officially designated as railway number 40 is part of the  Pan-European Corridor V, which runs from Venice to Kyiv. The remaining  between Ormož and Croatian–Slovene border east of Središče ob Dravi is classified as line number 44. The railway is mostly single-tracked and non-electrified.

History 
The construction of this railway was planned by the Emperor-Franz-Joseph Orient-Railway, which was merged in 1858 with the Austrian Southern Railway Company. On 24 April 1860, it was opened for traffic by the Southern Railway as a part of the railway from Kanizsa to Pragerhof.

Gallery

References

External links
 

Railway lines in Slovenia